The 1953 Clemson Tigers football team was an American football team that represented Clemson College in the Atlantic Coast Conference (ACC) during the 1953 college football season. In its 14th season under head coach Frank Howard, the team compiled a 3–5–1 record (1–2 against conference opponents), finished sixth in the ACC, and was outscored by a total of 172 to 139. The team played its home games at Memorial Stadium in Clemson, South Carolina.

End Dreher Gaskin and tackle Nathan Gressette were the team captains. The team's statistical leaders included quarterback Don King with 706 passing yards and 243 rushing yards and Dreher Gaskin with 30 points scored (5 touchdowns).

Three Clemson players were named to the 1953 All-South Carolina football team: Dreher Gaskin, Nathan Gressette, and Don King.

Schedule

References

Clemson
Clemson Tigers football seasons
Clemson Tigers football